Ishak, Ishaq or Eshaq may refer to:

 Ishak (name), list of people with this given name or surname
 Isaaq, a Somali clan-family in the Horn of Africa
 Ishaaq bin Ahmed, the semi-legendary forefather and common ancestor of the Isaaq clan-family
 Atakapa, a Native American people who call themselves the Ishak
 Ishak, Iran, a village in South Khorasan Province
 Eshaqabad, Shahr-e Babak, village in Kerman Province, Iran also known as Esḩāq or Is-hāq

See also
 Isaac (disambiguation)
 Izak (disambiguation)
 Ishak Pasha Palace